Alfred Coit (May 23, 1835 – January 17, 1879) was an American lawyer, judge, and politician.

Coit, son of Robert and Charlotte (Coit) Coit, was born in New London, Conn., May 23, 1835.

Coit graduated from Yale College in 1856.  After beginning the study of law with his brother, Robert Coit, Jr., in New London, he continued his studies in the Law School of Harvard University, receiving the degree of LL.B. in 1858. In November of the same year he was admitted to the New London County Bar, and practiced his profession with success and public esteem in his native city until his death in that place, January 17, 1879, after a short but severe illness, of anaemia of the brain.

He was a member of the Connecticut House of Representatives in 1862, 1863, and 1864, and of the Connecticut Senate in 1868. From 1865 to 1868 he was a member of the Connecticut State Board of Education, and Judge of Probate for the New London District in 1875–76. At the session of the State Legislature in January 1877, he was elected Judge of the Court of Common Pleas for New London County for four years from July 1, 1877, and was in the discharge of the duties of this office at the close of his life.

Coit was married, August 1, 1862, to Ellen Hobron of New London. His wife with five children survived him.

External links

1835 births
1879 deaths
Yale College alumni
Harvard Law School alumni
Connecticut lawyers
Connecticut state senators
Members of the Connecticut House of Representatives
19th-century American politicians
19th-century American lawyers